Conus galeyi is a species of sea snail, a marine gastropod mollusc in the family Conidae, the cone snails, cone shells or cones.

This snail is predatory and venomous and is capable of "stinging" humans.

Description
The length of the shell of the holotype measures .

Distribution
This marine species of cone snail occurs off Southern Madagascar.

References

 Monnier E., Tenorio M.J., Bouchet P. & Puillandre N. (2018). The cones (Gastropoda) from Madagascar “Deep South”: composition, endemism and new taxa. Xenophora Taxonomy. 19: 25-75. page(s): 49, pl. 13 figs 1-8

galeyi
Gastropods described in 2018